Buta Territory is a territory in Bas-Uele District, Orientale Province, Democratic Republic of the Congo. The administrative capital is located at Buta.

Geography
The territory borders Bondo Territory to the northwest, Bamesa Territory to the northeast and east, Aketi Territory to the west, Basoko Territory to the southwest and Banalia Territory of Orientale Province to the south. Rivers include the Balima River, Tele River, Lemoi River, Rubi River.

People
The territory contains populations of the Avuru-Mange speaking the Zande language.

Subdivisions
The territory contains the following chiefdoms/sectors:

Barisi-Mongingita Chiefdom
Bayeu-Bogongia Chiefdom
Bayeu-Bogbama Chiefdom
Mobati Chiefdom
Monganzolo Chiefdom
Nguru Chiefdom

As of 2003 the territory was divided into two health zones, one based on Buta and the other based on Titulé.}

References

Territories of Bas-Uélé Province